William Patrick Connery Jr. (August 24, 1888 – June 15, 1937) was a United States representative from Massachusetts. He was born in Lynn on August 24, 1888, the son of William P. Connery Sr. and brother of Lawrence Joseph Connery.

He attended St. Mary's School at Lynn, Collège de Montréal in Canada, and the College of the Holy Cross. He entered the theatrical profession as an actor. He also was a theater manager. During World War I he enlisted as a private in the One Hundred and First Regiment, United States Infantry, and served nineteen months in France. He was an electric company employee, he engaged in the manufacture of candy, and was secretary to the Mayor of Lynn.

He was elected as a Democrat to the Sixty-eighth and to the seven succeeding Congresses and served from March 4, 1923, until his death. He served as chairman of the Committee on Labor Seventy-second through Seventy-fifth Congresses, where he was the house sponsor of the first version of H.R. 7200, the Fair Labor Standards Act, which became law in a later iteration following his death, when it was signed by President Roosevelt on June 25, 1938. He studied law, and was admitted to the bar but did not practice extensively. He died in Washington, D.C., on June 15, 1937. His interment was in St. Mary's Cemetery in Lynn.

See also
 List of United States Congress members who died in office (1900–49)

External links
 
 

1888 births
1937 deaths
Catholics from Massachusetts
Politicians from Lynn, Massachusetts
College of the Holy Cross alumni
United States Army personnel of World War I
United States Army soldiers
Military personnel from Massachusetts
Democratic Party members of the United States House of Representatives from Massachusetts
20th-century American politicians